Farpoint Films is a television and film production company founded in 2000 by John Barnard and Kyle Bornais and based out of Winnipeg, Manitoba, Canada. They have produced more than 500 hours of national and international award winning television and film projects. Productions include Room for Rent, Sorry for Your Loss, From the Vine, The Illegal Eater, Escape Or Die! and The Medicine Line.

Filmography

Film

Television

Awards

References

External links
 
List of Farpoint Films productions at IMDb

Film production companies of Canada
Television production companies of Canada
Companies based in Winnipeg
Cinema of Manitoba
Mass media companies established in 2000